The Vijayawada–Nidadavolu loop line is a loop of ––– railway stations. Both Vijayawada and Nidadavolu stations lie on Howrah–Chennai main line. It is under the administrative jurisdiction of Vijayawada railway division of South Coast Railway zone.

References

5 ft 6 in gauge railways in India
Rail transport in Andhra Pradesh

Transport in West Godavari district
Transport in Krishna district
Transport in Vijayawada